The Indonesian Malaysians (Malay/Indonesian: Orang Malaysia Keturunan Indonesia) are Malaysian citizens of Indonesian ancestry. Today, there are many Malaysian Malays who have lineage from the Indonesian archipelago and have played an important role in the history and contributed to the development of Malaysia, they have been assimilated with other Malay communities and are grouped as part of the foreign Malays or anak dagang in terms of race. The Malaysian census does not categorize ethnic groups from the Indonesian archipelago as a separate ethnic group, but rather as Bumiputera. 

Article 160 of the Malaysian Constitution only states the criteria for a person to be considered a Malay; which is to profess the religion of Islam, habitually speak the Malay language, conform to Malay custom and be born to a Malaysian parent.

Several ethnic groups of Indonesian origin such as Acehnese, Minangkabau, Javanese, Banjarese, Mandailing and Bugis have significant migration to Malaysia and form significant communities in Malaysia. Negeri Sembilan, in particular, has large numbers of Minangkabau, Acehnese in Kedah, Javanese in Johor, Banjar in Perak and Bugis in Selangor and Sabah. There are three kings and six prime ministers of Malaysia who also have ethnic lineage from the Indonesian archipelago, such as the kings of Johor and Selangor who have Bugis lineages, and king of Negeri Sembilan who have Minangkabau lineages. Malaysia's former first king Tuanku Abdul Rahman, Najib Razak, and Muhyiddin Yassin, each of them have Minangkabau, Bugis, and Javanese ancestry.

History
The history of Indonesia and history of Malaysia were often intertwined. Throughout their history, the borders of ancient kingdoms and empires – such as Srivijaya, Majapahit, Malacca and Johor-Riau – often comprised both modern-day countries. For centuries, the relations, migrations, and interactions between Indonesian and Malaysian people have been quite intense, and it is common for Malaysians to trace their relatives in Indonesia and vice versa.

The migration of Indonesian to Malaysia can be traced back since before the colonial time especially during the Srivijaya and Majapahit administration. The first king of the Malacca Sultanate was descended from the Srivijaya prince Sang Nila Utama from Palembang. Interracial marriages between Sultanates such as between Sultan Mansur Shah of Malacca and the Princess Raden Galuh Chandra Kirana of Majapahit are stated in the Malay Annals. Other historical texts such as Tuhfat al-Nafis (known as Sejarah Melayu dan Bugis (History of the Malays and Bugis)), stated the relations between different Sultanates of Johor-Riau, Kedah, Perak, Selangor, Pahang, and Terengganu on the peninsula with the east and west coasts of Sumatra and Kalimantan.

During the British occupation, Malaysia was integrated into the world's commodity and capital markets, became a source of resources for the colonizers (suzerain) and began to face labor shortages. Britain then looked for sources of labor from countries such as India and China. Indonesians became the third source of labor and the British viewed and treated them differently from Indians and Chinese because they were considered to have the same race as Malays.

Post-decolonization, the government, like other political institutions in a democracy, tries to maintain its mandate and legitimacy through elections. This has implications for providing incentives and broadening the support base. By classifying Indonesian migrants (such as Javanese, Minangkabau, Bugis, Bawean, Banjar, Mandailing, Acehnese and others) into ethnic Malays, the government party Pertubuhan Kebangsaan Melayu Bersatu or UMNO expanded its mass base. The reason for the classification and the criteria for ethnic Malays in the Malaysian constitution is a socio-historical construction. This historical aspect exists because the identity defined in the Malaysian constitution has existed since the time of the Malacca sultanate in contrast to the Orang Asli or the Dayak people. So that anyone who meets the socio-religious requirements of the Malays is classified as a Malay (ethnic group).

Population

Minangkabau

The Minangkabau Malaysians are people of full or partial Minangkabau descent who were born in or immigrated to Malaysia. They form a significant part of Malaysia's population and Malaysian law considers most of them to be Malays. The Minangkabau people originate from West Sumatra, have a long history of migration to Malaysia. Minangkabau people are dominant in Negeri Sembilan, both in terms of population, politics, and culture. At the beginning of the 14th century, the Minangkabau people arrived in Negeri Sembilan via Melaka and initially settled in Rembau. The Minangkabau people who arrived at that time had a more advanced civilisation than the Orang Asli (a term used to describe the indigenous people in the are) in Negeri Sembilan. From the marriage between the Minangkabau people and the Orang Asli, the Biduanda clan was born. It is from the Biduanda clan that the chieftains of Negeri Sembilan (the 'Penghulu' and 'Undang') descend. The initial migration of the Minangkabau people mostly came from the Tanah Datar and Payakumbuh areas of West Sumatra.

Before the establishment of the Yang di-Pertuan Besar post and the royal institution, Negeri Sembilan was under the protection of the Malacca Sultanate and then the Johor Sultanate. In the 18th century the weakened Johor was no longer able to protect Negeri Sembilan from Bugis attacks. Therefore, the leaders of Negeri Sembilan requested that they be allowed to invite a prince from Pagaruyung (West Sumatra) to rule over them. The then King of Pagaruyung, Sultan Abdul Jalil, granted the request and sent Raja Melewar to become King, or Yamtuan Besar in Seri Menanti. 

The Negeri Sembilan people follow the Adat Perpatih customs and traditions, which involves inheritance based on matrilineal lineage; clan lineage is also determined by matrilineal descent.

The population census in Malaysia does not categorise Minangkabau as a separate ethnic group, but is generally classified as Malay. However, based on estimates, there are around 989,000 Minangkabau people living in Malaysia. Although accounting for less than 5% of Malaysia's population, their presence has contributed significantly to the development of this country. Before independence, there were many Minangkabau people in Malaysia who took part and held significant influence. They were mostly traders, clerics, and politicians. Long before the arrival of the British to Penang, there were already many Minang businessmen who traded on the island. Datuk Jannaton, Nakhoda Intan, dan Nakhoda Kecil are some of the cross-strait entrepreneurs based in Penang. In the 19th century, Muhammad Saleh Al-Minankabawi became the mufti of the Perak Kingdom and Uthman bin Abdullah became the first qadi in Kuala Lumpur. In addition, Mohamed Taib bin Haji Abdul Samad, who has a fairly large business, became an explorer in the Chow Kit area in Kuala Lumpur. In the mid-20th century, many Minangkabau figures became politicians at the same time. Some of them are Abdullah C.D., Ahmad Boestamam, Burhanuddin al-Hilmi, Shamsiah Fakeh, and Mokhtaruddin Lasso.

After independence, many important Malaysian figures and public figures were of Minangkabau descent. These include Sheikh Muszaphar Shukor, Malaysia's first spaceman, Rais Yatim, the longest serving government minister, U-Wei bin Haji Saari, one of Malaysia's acclaimed directors, entrepreneur Kamarudin Meranun, and Saiful Bahri, the composer of Malaysia's national anthem, "Negaraku".

Bugis
The Bugis Malaysians are people of full or partial Bugis descent who were born in or immigrated to Malaysia. They form a significant part of Malaysia's population and Malaysian law considers most of them to be Malays. The Bugis people originate from South Sulawesi and have played an important role in Malaysian history. The Bugis at that time were directly involved in the politics of the Malay kingdoms. The conclusion in 1669 of a protracted civil war led to a diaspora of Bugis and their entry into the politics of the Sumatra and Malay Peninsula. The Bugis played an important role in defeating Jambi and had a huge influence in Sultanate of Johor. Apart from the Malays, another influential faction in Johor at that time was the Minangkabau. Both the Buginese and the Minangkabau aware how the death of Sultan Mahmud II had provided them with the chance to exert major influence in Johor. 

It started when King Sulaiman Badrul Alam Shah wanted to control Johor and Riau lingga which was controlled by Sultan Abdul Jalil Rahmat Shah or known as	Raja Kecil. Then with the help of the Bugis from Klang, King Sulaiman managed to seize the territory of Johor and Riau Lingga from the hands of Raja Kecil. In return, King Sulaiman gave the title of Yang Dipertuan Muda to Daeng Marewah who ruled in Johor and Riau Lingga. Until now the kings in the Sultanate of Johor and the Sultanate of Selangor are of Bugis descent. The population census in Malaysia also does not categorize the Bugis as a separate ethnic group, but rather as a Malay ethnic group. The presence of the Bugis in Malaysia has become a part of history and a contribution to the development of the State of Malaysia. Several Prime Ministers in Malaysia are of Bugis descent, include Tun Abdul Razak and his son Najib Razak. There are also many Malaysian public figures who have Bugis ancestry such as the famous Malaysian singer, Yuna.

In modern Malaysia, Buginese are classified as Bumiputera (like members of other historical immigrant ethnicities originating from Indonesia).

Javanese

The Javanese Malaysians are people of full or partial Javanese descent who were born in or immigrated to Malaysia. They form a significant part of Malaysia's population and Malaysian law considers most of them to be Malays. They come from Java, Malaysia is home to the largest Javanese population outside Indonesia. Many important and well-known figures in Malaysia are of Javanese descent. Javanese migration to Malaysia had occurred before the colonial era. The first wave of Javanese people came during the Sultanate of Malacca era in the 15th century. Political marriages between kingdoms, such as between Sultan Mansur Shah of Malacca sultanate and Princess Raden Galuh Chandra Kirana of Majapahit, were an evidence that the interaction between nations has started a long time ago. This story is told in the 16th century ancient Malay manuscript, Sulalatus Salatin. The Javanese in Malaysia have adapted to the local culture and social values very well. The Javanese in Malaysia have adopted Malay culture, they speak Malay and use Malay names.

The presence of the Javanese in Malaysia has become part of the history and contribution to the development of the state of Malaysia. Many political figures have held important positions in the Malaysian government, including Ahmad Zahid Hamidi, previous Deputy Prime Minister of Malaysia, and Muhyiddin Yassin, who served as the 8th Prime Minister of Malaysia. There are also many Malaysian artists of Javanese descent, such as Mohammad Azwan bin Mohammad Nr or better known as Wak Doyok, a businessman and fashion icon and also Herman Tino, the pioneer of dangdut singers in Malaysia.

Most Malaysians of Javanese descent have assimilated into the local Malay culture, and speak Malay as a native tongue and first language rather than the Javanese language of their ancestors. This occurs through usual assimilation, as well as intermarriages with other ethnic groups. This qualifies them as Malays under Malaysian law. The situation is identical with the Javanese in Singapore, where they are considered Malay.

Banjar
The Banjar Malaysians are people of full or partial Banjar descent who were born in or immigrated to Malaysia. They form a significant part of Malaysia's population and Malaysian law considers most of them to be Malays. In contrast to the Malay Peninsula, in Sabah the Banjarese are considered a separate ethnic group from the Malays. In Malaysia, many Banjarese are still fluent in Banjarese and have culinary and cultural characteristics similar to their native South Kalimantan. Banjar communities in Malaysia can be found almost all over the country.

The Banjar people have emigrated to the Malay Peninsula hundreds of years ago. The first generation of Banjar people initially cultivated agricultural land. Many of them live in the Bagan Serai and Sungai Manik areas. Following World War II, the Banjarese contributed to the expulsion of communists in Malaysia.

Bawean
The Bawean Malaysians are people of full or partial Bawean descent who were born in or immigrated to Malaysia. The Bawean ethnicity in Malaysia is not as much as the Minang, Javanese, and Bugis ethnicities. Even so they are also categorized as Malays. The Bawean or Boyanese people come from Bawean Island, off the north coast of Java. In Malaysia, the Bawean people are better known as the Boyan people or Babian people. The word Boyan actually means driver or gardener, because at the beginning of the migration, many Baweans in Malaysia worked as drivers or gardeners. The lack of documentation and historical records has resulted in the exact time when the Baweans arrived in Malaysia. There are various theories regarding the arrival of the Baweans in the Malay Peninsula. There is an opinion that there was a Bawean named Tok Ayar who arrived in Melaka in 1819. In Melaka, the Baweans also spread to the Klang Valley, such as in the Ampang, Gombak, Balakong and Shah Alam areas. The population census in Malaysia does not categorize the Bawaean or Boyan people as a separate ethnic group but is classified as a Malay ethnicity. The presence of the Bawean people in Malaysia has become a part of history and a contribution to the development of the State of Malaysia.<ref name="tokayar">Sarifin, Muhammad Ridhwan dan Mohamdad Fauzi Sukimi. Serupa tapi berbeza: Kajian kes komuniti Bawean Kampung Sungai Tiram, Johor Malaysia. Universiti Kebangsaan Malaysia. Selangor. 2016</ref>

Acehnese
The Acehnese Malaysians are people of full or partial Acehnese descent who were born in or immigrated to Malaysia. They form a significant part of Malaysia's population and Malaysian law considers most of them to be Malays. They come from Aceh, northern tip of Sumatra. The existence of the Acehnese in Malaysia has existed for hundreds of years. Aceh's relations with countries in Peninsular Malaysia have existed since the 16th century. The Acehnese, especially in Penang, have contributed a lot to economic growth through the export of their natural wealth, especially pepper. During the war against the Dutch, Aceh made Penang a place for international lobbying, to thwart Aceh from Dutch colonialism. The Lebuh Aceh Mosque is the oldest mosque in Penang. Currently, it is estimated that there are hundreds of thousands of people of Acehnese descent in Malaysia. Many Acehnese in Malaysia have played important and influential roles in Malaysia such as songwriter and singer P. Ramlee and former Minister Sanusi Junid.

Notable people

Minangkabau ancestry

 Abdul Aziz Shamsuddin, Minister
 Abdul Aziz Zainal, 14th Commander-in-Chief of the Malaysian Armed Forces
 Abdul Rahim Kajai, Writer
 Tuanku Abdul Rahman, The first Malaysian Yang Dipertuan Agong 
 Abdul Samad Idris, Politician
 Abdullah CD, Politician
 Adnan Saidi, Malaysian hero
 Ahmad Boestamam, Politician
 Aishah, Singer
 Aishah Ghani, Minister
 Amirsham Abdul Aziz, Minister
 Yam Tuan Antah, Yang Dipertuan Besar Negeri Sembilan
 Aziz Ishak, Minister
 Aznil Nawawi, Actor
 Burhanuddin al-Helmy, Politician
 Dato' Bahaman, Warrior
 Datuk Jannaton, Businessman
 Firdaus Abdullah, Writer
 Ghafar Baba, Deputy Prime Minister
 Ghazali bin Mohd. Yusoff, Businessman
 Ghazali Shafie, Malaysian minister
 Hamdan Sheikh Tahir, The Head of State of Penang
 Hussamuddin Yaacob, Businessman
 Ibrahim Anon, Cartoonist
 Ismail Mohamad Ali, Governor of the Central Bank of Malaysia
 Ja'afar of Negeri Sembilan, The tenth Yang di-Pertuan Agong
 Kamarudin Meranun, Businessman
 Khairy Jamaluddin, Minister
 Khatijah Sidek, Politician
 Marina Mahathir, Novelist
 Melewar of Negeri Sembilan, The first  Yamtuan Besar'' (equivalent to King) of Negri Sembilan
 Mohammad Bakri Omar, 6th Malaysia Police Chief
 Mohamed Hashim Mohamad Ali, 7th Commander-in-Chief of the Malaysian Armed Forces
 Mohamed Taib bin Haji Abdul Samad, Businessman
 Muhammad Saleh Al-Minankabawi, Mufti
 Mujahid Yusof Rawa, Politician
 Mukhriz Mahathir, Politician
 Nasimuddin Amin, Businessman
 Norma Yaakob, Chief Judge of Malaysia
 Osman Gumanti, Actor
 Rashid Maidin, Politician
 Razali Ismail, Diplomat
 Rosmah Mansor, First lady of Malaysia
 Rosnani Jamil, Film producer
 Rustam Abdullah Sani, Sociology
 Saiful Bahri, Composer of the Malaysian National Anthem, Negaraku
 Shamsiah Fakeh, Politician
 Shaziman Abu Mansor, Minister
 Sheikh Muszaphar Shukor, Malaysian first astronaut
 Siti Hasmah Mohamad Ali, First lady of Malaysia
 Tahir bin Jalaluddin, Islamic scholar
 Tunku Abdullah, Businessman
 Tunku Imran, Businessman
 Tunku Naquiyuddin, Businessman
 Utsman bin Abdullah, Muslim ulama
 U-Wei bin Haji Saari, Film director
 Yusof Rawa, Politician
 Zainal Abidin bin Ahmad, Writer
 Zahrain Mohamed Hashim, Diplomat
 Zaquan Adha Abdul Radzak, Football player

Bugis ancestry

 Abu Bakar of Johor, the 21st sultan of the Johor Sultanate in Malaysia
 Ma'mun Sulaiman, Politician.
 Muhyiddin Yassin, Deputy Prime Minister of Malaysia 
 Najib Razak, 6th Prime Minister of Malaysia.
 Nazir Razak, Banker.
 Abdul Razak Hussein, 2nd Prime Minister of Malaysia 
 Sultan Salehuddin Shah ibni Almarhum Daeng Chelak, the 1st sultan of the Sultan of Selangor in Malaysia.
 Ziana Zain, Malaysian singer.
 Daeng Sanusi Daeng Mariok, Malaysian Politician.
 Andi Muhammad Suryady Bandy, Sabah State Assistant Minister of Youth and Sports.
 Lisa Surihani, Malaysian actress, model, television host and commercial model.
 Yuna, Malaysian singer-songwriter

Javanese ancestry
 Herman Tino, Dangdut singer
 Wak Doyok, Model and artist
 Djamal Tukimin, Writer
 Ahmad Zahid Hamidi, Minister
 Muhyiddin Yassin, 8th Prime Minister of Malaysia
 Sahruddin Jamal, Former First Minister of Johor
 Aziz Sattar, Actor

Banjarese ancestry

 Mohamed Khaled Nordin, 15th First Minister of Johor and Member of the Supreme Council of UMNO
 Abdul Latiff Ahmad, Former Deputy Minister of Defense and Member of Parliament
 Ahmad Husni Hanadzlah, Former Minister of Finance II and Member of Parliament for Tambun-BN/UMNO
 Hassan Bin Shukri, Former Senator, Member of the Senate, and Former Deputy President of PAS
 Sabran Bin Asmawi, Former member of parliament
 Hassan Adli Bin Mohd Arsyad, Former Minister of Local Government and Federal Territories-BN-PAS, Former Deputy President of PAS
 Mohd Puad Zarkashi, Former Deputy Minister of Education and Member of Parliament for Batu Pahat-BN/UMNO
 Badrianshah Mohd Hamdi, Member of Parliament for Lembah Pantai (Sabah)
 Saloma, Singer and actress.
 Sarimah Ibrahim, Actress, television host and radio announcer.
 Jamal Abdillah, Singer and actor.
 Ramly Bin Mokni, Founder Ramly Burger
 Nordin Bin Kadri, Academic figures
 Abdul Rahim Mohd Noor, Police Chief 1994-1999
 Musa Hassan, Police Chief 2006-2010
 Aliff Shukri Kamaruzzaman, Entrepreneur and singer
 Sarimah Ibrahim, Artist
 Jalaluddin Hassan, Actor and television host
 Mubarak Majid, Actor
 Shuib Sepahtu, Artist
 Zack Idris, Actor
 Jamal Abdillah, Pop singer and actor

See also
 Native Indonesians
 Demographics of Malaysia

References

 
Indonesian
Malaysia
Indonesia–Malaysia relations
Malaysian people of Indonesian descent
Immigration to Malaysia